Dorset was a significant area in the English Civil War. Significant sieges include those at Corfe Castle and Sherborne Castle.

Background 
Dorset was majority Royalist, except for in Lyme Regis and in Poole.

1642 
The Battle of Babylon Hill was fought at Babylon Hill in 1642, but the conflict was inconclusive.

1643 

Mary Bankes was a Royalist who defended Corfe Castle from a three-year siege inflicted by the parliamentarians.

Portland Castle was captured by a group of Royalists who gained access by pretending to be Parliamentary soldiers.

1644 
The Siege of Lyme Regis was an eight-week blockade of Lyme Regis.

1645 
The Battle of Weymouth took place.

References

Works cited
 
 

17th century in Dorset
English Civil War by location
Military history of Dorset